Michael Christopher Kostka (born November 28, 1985) is a Canadian former professional ice hockey defenceman who played in the National Hockey League (NHL).

Playing career
After playing four seasons at the University of Massachusetts Amherst, he was signed to a professional contract by the Buffalo Sabres of the National Hockey League on March 25, 2008. He was assigned to the organization's American Hockey League (AHL) affiliate (at the time), the Rochester Americans. In his second professional season he moved with the Sabres to their new AHL affiliate, the Portland Pirates.

Kostka returned to the Rochester Americans, now the Florida Panther affiliate for the 2010–11 season on August 24, 2010. On June 30, 2011, Kostka signed a two-way contract with the Florida Panthers and was assigned again to the Americans. On December 2, 2011, Kostka was traded by the Panthers, along with Evan Oberg, to the Tampa Bay Lightning for James Wright and Mike Vernace. Kostka joined the Lightning's AHL affiliate, the Norfolk Admirals and was a part of their Calder Cup championship.

On July 1, 2012, Kostka was signed as a free agent to a one-year contract with the Toronto Maple Leafs. Kostka got his first NHL point in his debut NHL game against the Montreal Canadiens on January 19, 2013. Kostka split the season with the Maple Leafs and their AHL affiliate, the Toronto Marlies.

On July 19, 2013, Kostka signed as a free agent to a one-year, two way contract with the defending Stanley Cup champions, the Chicago Blackhawks. He then scored his first NHL goal against the Leafs on October 19, 2013, against Jonathan Bernier. After only nine games with the Blackhawks and approaching the last quarter of the season, on February 23, 2014, Kostka was claimed off waivers by the Tampa Bay Lightning. Kostka finished the season with the Lightning.

Kostka left as a free agent to sign a one-year contract with the New York Rangers on July 1, 2014. He spent most of the season with the Rangers' AHL affiliate Hartford Wolf Pack.

On July 1, 2015, Kostka signed a one-year, two-way contract with the Ottawa Senators. Kostka was assigned to the Senators' AHL affiliate Binghamton Senators. Kostka made his Ottawa debut on March 6, 2016.

In the 2016–17 season, while in his second season with the Binghamton Senators, Kostka was included in a trade deadline deal by the Senators along with Curtis Lazar to the Calgary Flames in exchange for Jyrki Jokipakka and a conditional second-round pick in 2017.

As a free agent in the off-season, Kostka opted to sign his first professional contract abroad in agreeing to a try-out with Swedish top tier club, Skellefteå AIK of the SHL on September 1, 2017.

Career statistics

Awards and honors

References

External links

1985 births
Living people
Binghamton Senators players
Canadian ice hockey defencemen
Chicago Blackhawks players
Hartford Wolf Pack players
Ice hockey people from Ontario
New York Rangers players
Norfolk Admirals players
Ottawa Senators players
People from Ajax, Ontario
Portland Pirates players
Rochester Americans players
Rockford IceHogs (AHL) players
San Antonio Rampage players
Skellefteå AIK players
Stockton Heat players
Tampa Bay Lightning players
Toronto Maple Leafs players
Toronto Marlies players
UMass Minutemen ice hockey players
Undrafted National Hockey League players
University of Massachusetts Amherst alumni
Canadian expatriate ice hockey players in Sweden